Notable earthquakes in the history of Costa Rica include the following:

See also 
 Geology of Costa Rica

References

External links
Observatorio Vulcanológico y Sismológico de Costa Rica (OVSICORI)

 Earthquakes
Costa Rica
Earthquakes
Earthquakes